Edmund Nägele FRPS is a German photographer.

Edmund Nägele started his career in a Munich advertising studio, before relocating to Ireland.

In 1962, John Hinde recruited two German photographers, Elmar Ludwig and Edmund Nägele and one British, David Noble to expand his eponymous postcard business. John Hinde Ltd. sent Edmund Nägele to Cyprus around 1969, where he recorded the life and scenery of this beautiful island. Large format film was used to produce postcard subjects, with colour separation and other post-processing being done in Milan - this included removing telegraph poles, television aerials and adding bright colours to vehicles and peoples clothing.

Edmund Nägele is remembered for his elaborately staged, colour-saturated images of Butlin's holiday camps taken in the 1960s.

In 1972 Edmund Nägele was awarded the Fellowship of the Royal Photographic Society of Great Britain (F.R.P.S.) and in 1982, Edmund Nägele started his own picture library in the United Kingdom. In 2010 Edmund Nägele returned to Bavaria where he now enjoys creating Digital Art.

References

External links

Photographers from Munich
Living people
Year of birth missing (living people)
German expatriates in Ireland